Gortnavern (Irish: Gort na bhFearn) is a townland in County Donegal, Ireland.

Gortnavern is also the name of an electoral division of Letterkenny, which had a population of 1,191 as of the 2016 census.

See also
 List of populated places in the Republic of Ireland

References

Townlands of County Donegal